Pocono Lake is a subsection of Pocono Pines in Monroe County, Pennsylvania, United States. Pocono Lake is located slightly west of Pocono Pines by Pennsylvania Route 940.

Pocono is a Native American name purported to mean "a stream between two mountains".

The school district is considered below the state average.

In 2014, economic decline caused an increase in the use of SNAP (Supplemental Nutrition Assistance Program) food stamps throughout the region. According to Rev. Luke Richards, pastor of the Pocono Lake Wesleyan Church, "huge needs" are "ever-changing" in the area.

Notable person

William Henry Christman, a laborer from Pocono Lake and an enlisted man in the United States Army during the U. S. Civil War, was the first soldier to be buried at Arlington National Cemetery, in 1864.

References

Unincorporated communities in Monroe County, Pennsylvania
Pocono Mountains
Unincorporated communities in Pennsylvania